Molly McMichael (born c. 1992) is an American actress from Dallas, Texas.

McMichael served as a production assistant for the short film Where Snakes Roam. In 2012, she starred in the Lifetime television pilot The Secret Lives of Wives in the role of a cafe patron, and in the film adaptation of Men, Women & Children as a high school student. In 2015, McMichael starred in her breakout role in the History Channel miniseries Texas Rising, portraying the role of Rebecca Pit, which premiered on May 25, 2015. That same year, she starred in Hannah Fidell's romantic drama film 6 Years, alongside Taissa Farmiga and Ben Rosenfield, portraying the role of Jessica. The film had its world premiere at South by Southwest on March 14, 2015.

Filmography

References

External links
 

Living people
21st-century American actresses
American film actresses
American television actresses
Actresses from Dallas
Texas State University alumni
Year of birth missing (living people)